Edwin Fitzgerald (Gerry) James (born October 22, 1934) is a Canadian former professional Canadian football running back and professional ice hockey player. He played for the Winnipeg Blue Bombers of the Canadian Football League (CFL) between 1952 and 1964 and the Toronto Maple Leafs of the National Hockey League (NHL) between 1955 and 1960. His is a member of the Canadian Football Hall of Fame, like his father, Eddie James, who also played for the Blue Bombers. James was born in Regina, Saskatchewan.

In a period overlapping the 1959 CFL season and 1959–60 NHL season, James became the only player to play in the CFL's Grey Cup (November 28, 1959—won cup) and the NHL's Stanley Cup (first game April 9, 1960—lost cup) in the same season.

Football career
A graduate of Kelvin High School in Winnipeg, James started his CFL career in 1952 when he became one of the youngest players ever to play in the CFL, at only 17 years old. (Tom Manastersky was several months younger when he joined the Montreal Alouettes in 1946).

As a kicker and a running back in the Bombers' powerful "run by committee" system, James helped the team to six Grey Cup appearances (1953, 1957, 1958, 1959, 1961, and 1962), earning four victories (1958, 1959, 1961 and 1962). This committee system over the years included Lorne Benson, Tom Casey, Leo Lewis, Bob McNamara and Charlie Shepard.

In the 1957 season James scored 19 touchdowns, one short of the record set a year earlier by Pat Abbruzzi. He did however set a CFL record with 18 rushing touchdowns, which stood alone until it was tied by Jim Germany in 1981 and was finally surpassed by Mike Pringle with 19 in the 2000 season. James rushed the ball 197 times for 1,192 yards that season. He was part of the Blue Bombers until 1963, then played in 1964 with the Saskatchewan Roughriders.

When he retired from the CFL, James was the second all-time leading Canadian running back with totals of 994 carries for 5,554 yards and 57 touchdowns, behind only Normie Kwong. James was a two-time winner – 1954 and 1957 – of the CFL's Most Outstanding Canadian award.

James was inducted into the Canadian Football Hall of Fame in 1981, joining his father, Eddie James, who was inducted in 1963.

Hockey career
James was also a professional ice hockey right winger who played a total of 164 games in the National Hockey League for the Toronto Maple Leafs over 5 seasons in the late 50s (1954-55 to 1959-60), playing in 149 regular season games and 15 playoff games, finishing with 41 career points (15 goals and 26 assists).

At the age of sixteen, James played with the Winnipeg Monarchs junior hockey team in the 1951 Memorial Cup (a loss). The Toronto Maple Leafs, who owned James' professional hockey rights, decided to move him to Toronto to play for the Toronto Marlboros, their top junior team.  James would win the 1955 Memorial Cup playing with the Marlboros – only a few months after winning the CFL's Most Outstanding Canadian award.  A few days after the Memorial Cup win, James also played his first NHL game with the Maple Leafs – ending a tremendous series of multi-sport and multi-league achievements within a five-month period.

In the 1955–56 NHL season, immediately after rushing for a career-high season of 1,205 yards and being chosen a Western All-Star for the 1955 Canadian football season, James rejoined the NHL's Maple Leafs for their last 51 games, including a 5-game run in the Stanley Cup Playoffs.

James played a career-high 53 games in the 1956–57 NHL season, also marking his biggest season for NHL goals (4), assists (12), points (16) and penalty minutes (90).

The following 1957 football season saw James win his second Most Outstanding Canadian award on November 29, play in the CFL's 1957 Grey Cup Championship the afternoon of November 30 in Toronto, and that same night play his first game of the 1957–58 NHL season with the Maple Leafs.

James played only 15 games with the Maple Leafs in the 1957–58 NHL season, being sent to the team's Rochester Americans farm team for a further 15 games of ice hockey.  He was only able to join the Maple Leafs in a management role for the 1958–59 NHL season, due to a leg injury suffered in the 1958 CFL season.

In the 1959–60 NHL season, immediately after winning the CFL's 1959 Grey Cup, James rejoined the NHL's Maple Leafs as a player for their last 44 games, including a 10-game run into the 1960 Stanley Cup Championship finals. With his on-field and on-ice play between November, 1959, and April, 1960, James became the only player in history to play in the Grey Cup and Stanley Cup finals in the same season.

The Maple Leafs did not use James in the 1960-61 season, lending him to the Winnipeg Warriors in the minor pro Western Hockey League for his last year of professional hockey.

James would play some senior ice hockey in Saskatchewan over the next few years, then became a Tier II/Junior A head coach in 1973 in the Saskatchewan Junior Hockey League (SJHL).  Over a twelve-year period, James would coach eight SJHL seasons with the Yorkton Terriers, the Melville Millionaires and the Estevan Bruins. He coached these teams to seven winning seasons and a lifetime record of: 249 wins, 191 losses, 14 ties for a 0.622 winning percentage. He just missed a perfect sweep of winning seasons when his 1979-80 Melville Millionaires finished a half-game below 0.500: 29–30–1. James later coached the 1988-89 season with the Moose Jaw Warriors of the major junior Western Hockey League.

Retirement
When he retired from competitive football, James remained active in hockey. In 1963, he coached in Switzerland and managed hockey teams in Yorkton, Melville, and Moose Jaw of the Saskatchewan Junior Hockey League in the 1980s. James currently resides in British Columbia. Gerry has been a member of the Allwood Finishers, Dart Team in Parksville on Vancouver Island, since 2015. In 2017 the Allwood Finishers won the District 69 Dart League "A" Division Championship trophy for the second year in a row.

Awards and achievements
1955 Memorial Cup Championship winner
CFL's Most Outstanding Canadian Award,  1954 and 1957
CFL Grey Cup Championship winner, 1958, 1959, 1961 and 1962
Manitoba Sports Hall of Fame and Museum, inducted 1982.
 Selected as one of the Blue Bombers All-Time Greats.

CFL Statistics
Year Team GP TC Yds Avg TD Long

1952 WPG 10    93 9.3 2

1953 WPG 25   120 4.8 1

1954 WPG 106  576 5.4 4 71

1955 WPG 89  1205 6.4 7 60

1956 WPG 0      0 0 0 0

1957 WPG 197 1192 6.1 18 74

1958 WPG 64   372 5.8 2 21

1959 WPG 49   261 5.3 6 44

1960 WPG 165  872 5.3 9 28

1961 WPG 102  505 5 4 26

1962 WPG 84   345 4.1 5 15

1963 WPG 0      0 0 0 0 0

1964 SASK 10 4    13 3.3 0 7

Career statistics

Regular season and playoffs

References
The definitive authorized biography of Gerry James, Kid Dynamite: The Gerry James Story was published in 2011 by Oolichan Books

External links
 

1934 births
Living people
Canadian expatriate ice hockey players in Switzerland
Canadian Football Hall of Fame inductees
Canadian Football League Most Outstanding Canadian Award winners
Canadian ice hockey coaches
Canadian ice hockey right wingers
Ice hockey people from Saskatchewan
Moose Jaw Warriors coaches
Players of Canadian football from Saskatchewan
Rochester Americans players
Saskatchewan Roughriders players
Sportspeople from Regina, Saskatchewan
Toronto Maple Leafs players
Toronto Marlboros players
Winnipeg Blue Bombers players
Winnipeg Warriors (minor pro) players